Comodoria is a monotypic moth genus of the family Noctuidae. Its only species, Comodoria splendida, is found in Chubut Province of Argentina. Both the genus and species were first described by Paul Köhler in 1952.

References

Cuculliinae
Monotypic moth genera